André Gustave Robert Édouard Crémon (18 November 1893 – 12 October 1970) was a French modern pentathlete. He competed at the 1928 Summer Olympics.

References

External links
 

1893 births
1970 deaths
French male modern pentathletes
Olympic modern pentathletes of France
Modern pentathletes at the 1928 Summer Olympics